The Sanziniinae are a subfamily of boid snakes containing four species endemic to the island of Madagascar. Common names include Madagascar boas and Malagasy boas.

Taxonomy
This subfamily contains two genera, each one with two species:

Acrantophis - Jan, 1860
 Acrantophis dumerili, Duméril's boa
 Acrantophis madagascariensis, Madagascar ground boa or Malagasy ground boa
Sanzinia - Gray, 1849
 Sanzinia madagascariensis, Madagascar tree boa or Malagasy tree boa
 Sanzinia volontany, Nosy Komba ground boaReferences

 Romer, A.S.: Osteology of the Reptiles''. Chicago: University of Chicago Press; 1956.

Further reading
 

Boidae
Snake subfamilies